Macarena is a Spanish female name, popular in Andalusia, in honor of the Virgin of Hope of Macarena.
Some sources also say that the name comes from the Greek "Makarios", which means "happy".

Notable people bearing this name include:
 Macarena Achaga (born 1992), Argentine model and television host
 Macarena Aguilar (born 1985), Spanish handballer
 Macarena Alonso (born 1993), Argentine handballer
 Macarena Gelman (Montevideo, 1976), Uruguayan activist, granddaughter of the Argentine poet Juan Gelman
 Macarena Gómez (born 1978), Spanish actress
 Macarena Hernández, American academic and journalist specializing in Latino issues
 Macarena Reyes (born 1984), Chilean athlete
 Macarena Ripamonti (born 1991), Chilean politician
 Macarena Rodríguez (born 1978), Argentine hockey player
 Macarena Sánchez (born 1991), Argentine football player
 Macarena Simari Birkner (born 1984), Argentine skier
 The Macarena (born 1991), Spanish drag queen

Spanish feminine given names